The Kanon anime, which encompasses two television series produced by different studios and an original video animation (OVA), is based on the visual novel Kanon by the Japanese visual novel brand Key. The story follows the main character Yuichi Aizawa, who has returned to the town where seven years ago he would spend his school vacations. As he used to do back then, he is living with his aunt Akiko Minase and his cousin Nayuki, but has forgotten many of the details regarding his previous visits. Over the course of the series Yuichi slowly regains these memories as he meets new friends and is reacquainted with others from his past.

Thirteen episodes were produced for the first Kanon anime series by Toei Animation and directed by Takamichi Itō. The episodes were broadcast between January and March 2002, and were later released to Region 2 DVD between April and October 2002 by Frontier Works. Spanning seven volumes, each volume contained two episodes except the first which had one. The series was re-released as a seven-disc DVD box set in December 2004 by Frontier Works in limited and regular editions in Japan. In March 2003, an OVA episode, Kanon Kazahana, was released on DVD. It was also produced by Toei Animation and directed by Takamichi Itō.

Twenty-four episodes were produced for the second Kanon anime series by Kyoto Animation and directed by Tatsuya Ishihara. The episodes were broadcast between October 2006 and March 2007, and were later released to Region 2 DVD between January and August 2007 by Pony Canyon in limited and regular editions containing three episodes per volume. While the plot does not differ from the first anime, the greater number of episodes allows the inclusion of more detail from the visual novel on which the series is based. The second anime series was licensed for North American distribution by Funimation Entertainment. The episodes were released on Region 1 DVDs in six volumes between January and October 2008, and a box set containing the entire series was released in April 2009.

Kanon (2002)
The first anime adaptation under the title Kanon is produced by the Japanese animation studio Toei Animation, directed by Takamichi Itō, written by Ryota Yamaguchi, Makoto Nakamura, and Michiko Yokote, and features character design by Yōichi Ōnishi who based the designs on Itaru Hinoue's original concept. Thirteen episodes were produced which aired after midnight between January 31 and March 28, 2002 on the Fuji TV Japanese television network. Except for episodes three, four, and seven, the titles from the episodes are named for tracks on the visual novel's original soundtrack. The episodes were released to Region 2 DVD between April 1 and October 2, 2002 by Frontier Works. Spanning seven volumes, each volume contained two episodes except the first which had one. The series was re-released as a seven-disc DVD box set on December 22, 2004 by Frontier Works in limited and regular editions in Japan. In March 2003, an original video animation episode was released on DVD containing the single episode "Kanon Kazahana" also produced by Toei Animation and directed by Takamichi Ito. The episode is set at the same time as the last episode of the anime series. The DVD was released via a promotional campaign and was given to anyone who bought all seven DVDs for the first anime series. Two pieces of theme music are used for the episodes; one opening theme and one ending theme. The opening theme is "Florescence", and the ending theme is "Flower"; both songs are sung by Miho Fujiwara.

Kanon (2006–07)
The second anime adaptation also under the title Kanon is produced by the Japanese animation studio Kyoto Animation, directed by Tatsuya Ishihara, written by Fumihiko Shimo, and features character design by Kazumi Ikeda who based the designs on Itaru Hinoue's original concept. On August 25, 2006, a teaser DVD named "Kanon Prelude" was produced as a limited edition containing interviews with the cast, clean opening and ending sequences, and promotional footage of the anime itself. Twenty-four episodes were produced which aired between October 5, 2006 and March 15, 2007 on the Japanese television broadcasting station BS-i. While the plot does not differ from the first anime, the greater number of episodes allows the inclusion of more detail from the visual novel on which the series is based. The episodes were released to Region 2 DVD between January 1 and August 1, 2007 by Pony Canyon in limited and regular editions containing three episodes per volume. Pony Canyon released a Blu-ray Disc box set on December 16, 2009 in Japan.

The episodes were originally licensed for North America by ADV Films. The episodes were released on Region 1 DVD in six volumes between January 1 and October 14, 2008.  However, between volumes 5 and 6, the rights for the series were transferred to Funimation, who did a limited release of volume 6.  ADV supplied and completed the dub for the series. The second DVD volume was sold in two editions, with the difference between the two being a series box all the DVDs could fit inside. A box set containing the entire series was released by Funimation on April 28, 2009.

The non-Japanese words included in the original titles of the episodes are names or subgenres of classical music composition. Continuing with this theme, Pachelbel's Canon often plays in the background of some scenes. It was first heard in episode one, while Ayu and Yuichi hide in a café, then again during episode eleven in the ice-cream parlor Nayuki and Yuichi were visiting. It plays during the fourteenth episode, in a scene between Sayuri and Yuichi. The last time it is heard is during the final episode where Akiko speaks with Yuichi in the same café as before. Another reference hidden in the anime is a homage to One: Kagayaku Kisetsu e a title that the Key team had worked on while they were still working for Tactics—Rumi Nanase, one of the heroines in One, has cameo appearances in several points in the anime.

Two pieces of theme music are used for the episodes; one opening theme and one ending theme. The opening theme for the second anime adaptation is "Last regrets", and the ending theme used for the same production ; both songs are sung by Ayana and were the original opening and ending themes from the visual novel. The rest of the soundtrack for the second anime series is sampled from several albums released for the Kanon visual novel including the Kanon Original Soundtrack, Anemoscope, Recollections, and Re-feel. This does not include an insert song used in episode sixteen titled "Last regrets (X'mas floor style)" by Eiko Shimamiya from I've Sound's first album Regret.

References

External links
First Kanon anime's official website 
Second Kanon anime's official website 

Episodes
Kanon